Örgryte is one of the 21 stadsdelsnämndsområden (a kind of district often translated as borough) of Gothenburg Municipality, Sweden. It is a largely upper middle class residential area, just to the east of the city centre. It has a population of 33,539 (2004), and covers an area of 10.67 square kilometres.

History
The original village of Örgryte is much older than the city of Göteborg, with construction in the area predating Göteborg. The original parish being much larger was subsequently absorbed by the city in a gradual process lasting from 1882 to 1922. Construction in the area predates the surrounding areas. The name Örgryte likely originates from the presence of several giant's kettles (jättegryt lit. giant's gryt in Swedish) in the area.

Geography
Örgryte contains 8 distinct, officially defined residential districts (primärområden):
 Bagaregården
 Kallebäck
 Kärralund
 Lunden
 Olskroken
 Redbergslid
 Skår
 Överås

Örgryte borders the following "city boroughs":
Gothenburg City Centre, to the west
Kortedala, to the north
Härlanda, to the east

It also borders the neighbouring Mölndal Municipality, to the south.

Places of interest
Dicksonska palatset (Dickson's Palace)
Kulturhuset Bagaregården (Culturehouse Bagaregården)
Örgryte gamla kyrka (Örgryte old church)
Östra kyrkogården (East cemetery) - a cemetery where many famous Swedish have their burial place. One of them is Karin Boye, another one is Dan Broström

Notable people from Örgryte
Ricky Bruch, 1972 Olympic bronze medallist in the discus throw
Elena Paparizou, winner of the Eurovision Song Contest 2005, representing Greece

See also
Örgryte IS, football club based in Örgryte

External links
Official website: Göteborgs Stad - Örgryte (in Swedish)
Swedish Wikipedia entry

References

Gothenburg
Populated places in Västra Götaland County